William Ashe Dymoke Windham (2 April 1926 – 5 January 2021) was a British rower who competed for Great Britain in the 1952 Summer Olympics.

Biography
Born in Biggleswade, Bedfordshire, on 2 April 1926, Windham was educated at Bedford School and Christ's College, Cambridge. In 1947 and 1951 he was a member of the winning Cambridge boat in the Boat Race. He rowed for England in the Empire Games in 1950, for Great Britain in the European Rowing Championships in 1950 and 1951, winning a bronze medal in 1950 and a gold medal in 1951, and for Great Britain at the 1952 Summer Olympics. He was elected as a Steward of the Henley Royal Regatta in 1953, was a member of the Committee of Management of the Henley Royal Regatta between 1972 and 1994, and was High Sheriff of Powys between 1996 and 1997. His son is the royal courtier Ashe Windham.

He died on 5 January 2021 at the age of 94.

See also
List of Cambridge University Boat Race crews

References

1926 births
2021 deaths
People educated at Bedford School
Alumni of Christ's College, Cambridge
Cambridge University Boat Club rowers
English male rowers
Olympic rowers of Great Britain
Rowers at the 1952 Summer Olympics
Stewards of Henley Royal Regatta
Commonwealth Games medallists in rowing
Commonwealth Games bronze medallists for England
Rowers at the 1950 British Empire Games
European Rowing Championships medalists
High Sheriffs of Powys
Medallists at the 1950 British Empire Games